India participated in the 1986 Asian Winter Games held in Sapporo, Hokkaidō, Japan,  from March 1 to March 8. India failed to win any medal in the Games.

1986
Nations at the 1986 Asian Winter Games